Jamie Harding (born 12 June 1979) is an English actor best known for his role as 9/11 hijacker Ahmed al-Nami in the 2006 film, United 93.

Early life and career
Harding was born and brought up in London, England to an English father and a Sudanese  mother.

Harding has played major roles in several television shows, including Dalziel and Pascoe, Silent Witness and 24Seven, and minor roles in Resident Evil and the acclaimed TV-miniseries, Band of Brothers. He starred in the 2006 film O Jerusalem, and the 2009 film Espion(s) with Guillaume Canet.

Filmography

References

External links

1979 births
English male film actors
Living people
Male actors from London
English people of Sudanese descent